Ulurumyia macalpinei is a species of fly in the superfamily Oestroidea endemic to Australia. It was first discovered in the 1970s, but was not described until 2017, and in the intervening decades was informally known to entomologists as McAlpine's fly. It is said to be clearly distinct from other oestroid families but its exact position within the superfamily has not been determined with certainty. The genus name Ulurumyia is derived from Uluru, also known as Ayers Rock, Australia, and myia, the Greek word for fly; the species name macalpinei commemorates the Australian dipterist David K. McAlpine, the first person to collect specimens of this fly and realize their evolutionary distinctiveness.

References

Monotypic Diptera genera
Oestroidea
Diptera of Australasia